Beaver Creek is a river in the states of Kansas and Nebraska. It begins north-northeast of Goodland, Kansas and flows into Sappa Creek West of Orleans, Nebraska.

History
KDOT had to close a  section of K-117 by Herndon due to high water from the Beaver River flooding.

References

Rivers of Kansas
Rivers of Nebraska